Amar Talwar (born 21 December 1949) is an Indian artist and Bollywood actor. He appeared in the historic television series Shanti, in which he played Raj 'G.J.' Singh.

Born to a Sikh family on 21 December 1949, Talwar was educated at the Lawrence School, Sanawar, along with his brother Rana Talwar.

Before becoming an actor Talwar worked as a photojournalist. He is originally from Chandigarh but moved to Delhi for work. He joined UNICEF as photo journalist for the Girl Child Division and also for the Ford Foundation, amongst others. Along with being a photo journalist he started stage acting. His appeared with Amitabh Bachchan in the movie Kabhi Khushi Kabhi Gham, where he portrayed Rani Mukerji's character's father.

Filmography

Television
 1994 - 1998 Shanti as Raj G.J. Singh
 1998 Saaya (Indian TV series) - Mr Mehra, Tanya's father
 1998 Rishtey - Do Boondein Chaand Ki - Episode 19
 1998 Saturday Suspense as Mr. Kumar (Episode 75)
 2001 - 2002 Jannat as Zaheer
 2001 - 2003 Sarhadein
 2003 ; 2005 - 2006 Kahiin to Hoga as Professor Sinha
 2003 - 2006 Jassi Jaissi Koi Nahin as Purushottam Suri (Armaan's father)
 2004 Raat Hone Ko Hai - Adhikar as Anil's father (Episode 13)
 2005 - 2006 Kituu Sabb Jaantii Hai as Balraj
 Mad about money

References

External links
 Amar Talwar Movies
 

1949 births
Living people
Male actors in Hindi cinema
Lawrence School, Sanawar alumni
Indian male television actors
Male actors from Chandigarh